Nemacheilus pfeifferae is a species of ray-finned fish in the genus Nemacheilus from Sumatra.

Footnotes 

 

P
Freshwater fish of Indonesia
Fish described in 1853